The Devoluy Mountains is a limestone massif located in Hautes-Alpes, France. It is part of the Dauphiné Prealps and is bordered by the Drac River to the north and the Buëch River to the south and west and is a popular destination for hiking, mountaineering and skiing. Its most notable peaks are the Grande Tête de l'Obiou (2,789 m) and Pic de Bure at 2,709 m.

References

Dauphiné Prealps